The 2007 Bandy World Championship was held in Kemerovo, Russia, 27 January – 4 February 2007. Men's national teams from 12 countries participated in the 2007 tournament: Belarus, Finland, Kazakhstan, Norway, Russia, Sweden (group A) and Estonia, Hungary, Latvia, Mongolia, the Netherlands and the United States (group B). Canada was initially also supposed to take part in the tournament but withdrew so Latvia took its place. Belarus retained their place in group A by beating the United States in a playoff at the end of the previous tournament held in 2006. The local time in Kemerovo is UTC+7.

Participating teams

Division A

Division B

Division A

Preliminary round

Knockout stage

Semi-finals

Third place play-off

Final

Statistics

Goalscorers
19 goals

  Sergey Obukhov

16 goals

  David Karlsson

14 goals

  Daniel Andersson

13 goals

  Yevgeny Ivanushkin
  Sami Laakkonen
  Pavel Ryazantsev

12 goals

  Vyacheslav Bronnikov

11 goals

  Sergey Lomanov, Jr.

9 goals

  Denis Kriushenkov

7 goals

  Sergey Tarasov

6 goals

  Marcus Bergwall
  Jonas Edling
  Ivan Maksimov

5 goals

  Ville Aaltonen
  Johan Andersson
  Sergey Chernetsky
  Kjetil Johansen
  Christer Lystad
  Andrey Morikov
  Mikhail Sveshnikov

4 goals

  Mikko Aarni
  Maksim Chermnykh
  Denis In-Fa-Lin
  Rasmus Lindqvist
  Thomas Moen
  Mika Mutikainen

3 goals

  Stefan Erixon
  Påhl Hanssen
  Samuli Niskanen
  Evgenij Sviridov
  Anton Zybarev

2 goals

  Marius Austad
  Olov Englund
  Per Hellmyrs
  Rauan Isaliev
  Daniel Mossberg
  Magnus Muhrén
  Vladislav Novozhilov
  Pekka Rintala
  
  Dmitry Starikov
  Yury Stepochkin
  Aleksandr Tyukavin
  Yury Vikulin
  Dmitrij Zavidovskij
  Igor Zolotarev

1 goal

  Hans Andersson
  Kjetil Bergh
  Vadim Bogdanovich
  Artem Botvenkov
  Mikhail Dobrynin
  Aleksandr Dryagin
  Antti Ekman
  Stian Holmen-Jensen
  Kimmo Huotelin
  Petteri Lampinen
  Jan Magnus Olaisen
  Tommi Österberg
  Anders Östling
  Yury Pogrebnoy
  Roman Poloskin
  Denis Slautin
  Mikhail Tarasenko
  Christian Waaler
  Alexei Zagarskikh
  Alexej Zolotarev

Division B

All Division B games 2x30 minute halves apart from A6-B1 playoff which is of regular 2x45 minute halves

Preliminary round 

 28 January
 Netherlands – USA  0–11
 Latvia – Mongolia  5–0
 Estonia – Hungary  2–4
 Netherlands –	Mongolia  2–2

 29 January
 Hungary – Latvia  0–7
 USA – Mongolia  8–0
 Netherlands – Estonia  5–1
 USA – Hungary  12–2

 30 January
 Estonia – Mongolia  5–0
 USA – Latvia  6–1
 Netherlands – Hungary  2–3
 Estonia – Latvia  1–7

 31 January
 USA – Estonia 14–2
 Netherlands – Latvia 1–6
 Hungary – Mongolia 2–2

Final round
 1 February and 2 February
 Estonia – Mongolia  1–4, 2–2
 Netherlands – Hungary  3–1,  4–3
 Latvia – USA  0–5,  6–2

Division A play-off	
 Belarus – USA  9–1

See also
 Bandy World Championship

References

External links
 Bandy World Championship site

World Championship
2007 in Russian sport
2007
Sport in Kemerovo
World Championship,2007
January 2007 sports events in Asia
February 2007 sports events in Asia